Xiang Xiu is one of the Seven Sages of the Bamboo Grove.

His most famous contribution is a commentary on the Zhuangzi, which was later used and amended by Guo Xiang. After his friend Xi Kang was killed by the ruling Jin dynasty, Xiang carefully interpreted his previous antagonistic words to the emperor, Sima Zhao in a new light. Thus he avoided the charge of treason, unlike his friend.

He wrote the work Xiang Xiu Biequan ("Separate Biography").

References
Richard B. Mather, "The Controversy over Conformity and Naturalness during the Six dynasties", History of Religions, Vol. 9.

See also
Guo Xiang

Seven Sages of the Bamboo Grove
Cao Wei politicians
Jin dynasty (266–420) politicians
Politicians from Jiaozuo
Jin dynasty (266–420) Taoists
Chinese spiritual writers
Cao Wei writers
Jin dynasty (266–420) writers
Writers from Jiaozuo
Xuanxue